Einhorn is German for unicorn. It is also used as a surname. Notable people with the surname include:

Alfred Einhorn (1856–1917), biochemist, inventor of procaine (Novocain)
David Einhorn (rabbi)
David Einhorn (hedge fund manager)
Dov Berish Einhorn, a Rabbi
Eddie Einhorn, a part owner of the Chicago White Sox baseball team
Edward Einhorn, theater director, playwright and novelist
Ephraim Einhorn (1918–2021), British rabbi based in Taiwan
Ira Einhorn, also known as the "Unicorn Killer"
Jerzy Einhorn, oncologist and politician, Holocaust survivor
Jessica Einhorn
Joseph Einhorn
Lawrence Einhorn
Lena Einhorn (born 1954), Swedish director, writer and physician
Martin B. Einhorn (born 1942), American theoretical physicist
Paul Einhorn
Randall Einhorn
Richard Einhorn, American composer
Stefan Einhorn (born 1955), Swedish doctor, professor and writer
Trevor Einhorn, American actor

In fiction
Lois Einhorn, a character in Ace Ventura: Pet Detective

See also 
 Unicorn (disambiguation)
 Eenhoorn (disambiguation), Dutch for unicorn

German-language surnames
Surname